Kalenow may refer to:
 Kalenow-e Olya
 Kalenow-e Sofla